F.M. Howell and Company is a late nineteenth-century manufacturing complex located on the banks of the Chemung River in Elmira, New York. F.M. Howell & Company was founded in 1883 in Elmira, New York by Fred M. Howell and John Aldrich. In its early years the company started out by producing wood and strawboard cigar and shoe boxes for other manufacturing companies. As this continued, they also added rigid paperboard boxes, and printing of box wraps and labels. Subsequently, this all led into the carton manufacturing, and plastic thermoforming for packaging. Later, on Howell got help from his cousin to help expand the company's horizons. 
 
Of the five contributing buildings, four are located on the east side of Pennsylvania Avenue (Buildings 1, 2, 3 & 5), while only the Brand Building is located on the west side of the street. It was added to the National Register of Historic Places in 1984.
F.M. Howell and & Company was the oldest independent manufacturer for the 19th century.

Gallery

References

http://www.chemungvalleymuseum.org/

Industrial buildings and structures on the National Register of Historic Places in New York (state)
Buildings and structures in Elmira, New York
National Register of Historic Places in Chemung County, New York